A number of overlapping punk rock subgenres have developed since the emergence of punk rock (often shortened to punk) in the mid-1970s. Even though punk genres at times are difficult to segregate, they usually show differing characteristics in overall structures, instrumental and vocal styles, and tempo. However, sometimes a particular trait is common in several genres, and thus punk genres are normally grouped by a combination of traits.

Afro-punk 

Afro-punk (sometimes spelled AfroPunk) refers to the participation of African Americans in the punk and alternative music cultures. Afro-punks represent a majority in the punk culture in predominantly black regions of the world that have burgeoning punk communities, such as in parts of Africa. There are many punk rock bands with black members, and several with lineups that are all black. Notable bands that can be linked to the Afro-punk community include: Death, Pure Hell, Bad Brains, Suicidal Tendencies, Dead Kennedys, Fishbone, Wesley Willis Fiasco and Suffrajett.

Anarcho punk 

Anarcho-punk is punk rock that promotes anarchism. The term anarcho-punk is sometimes applied exclusively to bands that were part of the 1970s/1980s anarcho-punk movement in the United Kingdom. Some, however, use the term to refer to any punk music with anarchist lyrical content. Examples of anarcho-punk bands include Crass, Conflict, and Icons of Filth.

Art punk 

Art punk or avant punk refers to punk rock and post-punk music of an experimental bent, or with connections to art school, the art world, or the avant-garde. Examples of Art punk artists include A Frames, Art Brut, the Blood Brothers, Glenn Branca, Chicks on Speed, Chimera, Country Teasers, Crass, Daughters, the Death Set, Devo, and Television.

Christian punk 

Christian punk (or Christ punk, as it is called in reference to crust punk) is punk rock with some degree of Christian lyrical content. Given the edginess of punk and some of its subgenres, such as hardcore punk, many bands have been rejected by the Christian music industry. Due to the message and nature of Christian punk, many traditional punks ridicule it. Examples of Christian punk bands include MxPx, Crux, Dogwood, Officer Negative, and Outer Circle.

Crust punk 

Crust punk (also known as Crust or Stenchcore) is a subgenre which evolved in the early-1980s in England, and has songs with dark and pessimistic lyrics that linger on political and social ills. Crust is partly defined by its "bassy" and "dirty" sound. It is often played at a fast tempo with occasional slow sections. Vocals are usually guttural and may be grunted, growled or screamed. While the term was first associated with Hellbastard, Amebix have been described as the originators of the style, along with Discharge and Antisect.

Deathrock 

Deathrock is a subgenre of punk rock incorporating horror elements and spooky atmospherics, that emerged on the West Coast of the United States in the early 1980s. Deathrock songs use simple chords, echoing guitars and prominent bass. Drumming emphasizes repetitive, post-punk beats within a  time signature. To create atmosphere, scratchy guitars are sometimes used. Lyrics can vary, but are typically introspective and surreal, and deal with the dark themes of isolation, gloom, disillusionment, loss, life, death, etc.; as can the style, varying from harsh and dark to upbeat, melodic and tongue-in-cheek. Deathrock lyrics and other musical stylistic elements often incorporate the themes of campy horror and sci-fi films, which in turn leads some bands to adopt elements of rockabilly and surf rock.

Egg punk 
Egg punk is a mostly internet-based genre that started in Northwest Indiana, influenced by Devo and a hatred for the us vs them mentality of the emerging "chain punk" bands. Egg punk is satirical, danceable, energetic, and deeply cynical of the edgy "hardcore and serious" approach to music. Utilizing cheep synth, minimal recording and mixing. and with a hearty dependence on DIY artwork and style. Some bands that are examples of the egg punk genre include; Gee Tee, Powerplant, and Skull Cult.

Garage punk 

Garage punk is punk rock heavily influenced by garage rock. Other influences include soul music, beat music, surf rock, power pop and psychedelic rock. Often it uses lo-fi aesthetics over catchy melodies. Examples of garage punk bands include New Bomb Turks, Mudhoney, Foxboro Hot Tubs and the Hives.

Glam punk 

Glam punk (also called glitter punk) fuses elements of punk rock and glam rock, commonly reflected in image. Iggy Pop is a good example of this genre, as were the New York Dolls. Mötley Crüe's first album, Too Fast for Love, had many elements of glam punk in it.

Hardcore punk 

Hardcore punk (or hardcore) music is generally faster and more aggressive than earlier punk rock. Hardcore, which originated in the late 1970s, was heavily involved with the rise of the independent record labels in the 1980s, and with the DIY ethics in underground music scenes. It has influenced a number of music genres which have experienced mainstream success, such as alternative rock, grunge, alternative metal, metalcore, thrash metal, and post-hardcore. Examples of early hardcore punk bands include Black Flag, Bad Brains and Minor Threat. Examples of later hardcore bands include Gorilla Biscuits, Youth of Today and Agnostic Front.

Horror punk 

Horror punk mixes Gothic and punk rock sounds with morbid or violent imagery and lyrics, which are often influenced by horror films or science fiction B-movies. The genre is similar to, and sometimes overlaps with, deathrock, although horror punk music is typically more aggressive and melodic than deathrock. Some horror punk bands dress up in black clothes, skeleton costumes, and skull face paint. Examples of horror punk bands include Misfits, Balzac and Wednesday 13.

Oi! 

Oi! is a working class street-level subgenre of punk rock that originated in the United Kingdom in the 1970s. It had a goal of uniting punks, skinheads, and other working class youths. Notable early Oi! bands include: Cockney Rejects, Angelic Upstarts, the 4-Skins and the Business.

Peace punk 

Peace punk is a subgenre of punk rock with anti-war lyrics. The lyrics in peace punk advocate nonviolence and also often equality, freedom, animal liberation, veganism, ecology, human right and anarchy. The lyrics are against racism, sexism, homophobia, war, poverty, capitalism, the government and the military. Most peace punk bands are also anarcho-punk bands. Examples of peace punk bands include Crass and Flux of Pink Indians.

Punk pathetique 

Punk pathetique or Fun punk is a subgenre of British punk rock (principally active circa 1980–1982) that involved humour and working class cultural themes. Musically it was related to (and had crossover with) the Oi! subgenre. Example of Fun punk include TV Personalities, the Shapes, the Adicts and Notsensibles.

Queercore 

Queercore is a subgenre of punk that emerged in the 1980s after the publication of the zine J.D.s in Toronto. As a genre, queercore explores issues of gender identity, gender expression, and sexuality. Popular queercore bands include Limp Wrist, Queer Mutiny and Pansy Division. Festivals such as Queeruption feature music, art, film, performance art and DIY-aesthetic.

Riot Grrrl 

Riot Grrrl is a feminist punk/indie rock genre and subculture, whose popularity peaked in the 1990s. The subculture features elements such as female-centric bands, concerts and festivals; collectives, support groups, workshops, self-defense courses, activism and fanzines. Examples of Riot Grrrl bands include Bikini Kill, Sleater-Kinney and Bratmobile.

Skate punk 

Skate punk, also known as skatepunk, skate-punk, skate-thrash, surf punk, or skate-core, is a subgenre of punk that derived from hardcore punk. Skate punk most often describes the sound of melodic hardcore bands from the 1990s with an aggressive sound, and similar-sounding modern bands. Skate videos have traditionally featured this aggressive style of punk rock. Bands include, NOFX, The Offspring, Suicidal Tendencies, Pulley, Pennywise, Millencolin, Ten Foot Pole, Strung Out, Title Fight.

Street punk 

Street punk is a working class subgenre of punk rock which emerged in the early 1980s, partly as a rebellion against the perceived artistic pretensions of the first wave of British punk. Street punk developed from the Oi! genre, and then continued to go beyond the confines of the original Oi! style. A notable Street Punk band is Dogs in the Fight.

Taqwacore 

Taqwacore is a punk rock subgenre dealing with Islam and its culture, originally conceived in Michael Muhammad Knight's 2003 novel The Taqwacores. The name is a portmanteau of hardcore and the Arabic word Taqwa, which is usually translated as "piety" or the quality of being "God-fearing". Although Muslim punk rock dates back to at least the 1979 founding of the British band Alien Kulture. Knight's novel was instrumental in encouraging the growth of a contemporary North American Muslim punk movement. Taqwacore bands often challenge Islam as it exists, promoting a very liberal-progressive agenda.

Trallpunk 

Trallpunk is a subgenre of punk known for fast drumming, a melodic sound and often politically oriented lyrics.
It emerged from the late-1980s Swedish hardcore punk scene. Examples of trallpunk bands include Asta Kask, De Lyckliga Kompisarna and Krymplings.

Punk rock fusion subgenres

2 Tone 

2 Tone (or Two Tone) was a music genre created in England in the late 1970s by fusing elements of ska, punk rock, rocksteady, reggae and new wave. The 2 Tone sound was developed by young musicians in Coventry, West Midlands, England. The genre is the precursor of the third wave ska scene of the 1980s and 1990s. Examples of 2 Tone bands include the Specials, the Selecter and Madness.

Anti-folk 

Anti-folk (sometimes antifolk or unfolk) is a subgenre of folk music and punk rock that seeks to subvert the earnestness of politically charged 1960s folk music. The defining characteristics of this anti-folk are difficult to identify, as they vary from one artist to the next. Nonetheless, the music tends to sound raw or experimental; it also generally mocks perceived seriousness and pretension in the established mainstream music scene.

Celtic punk 

Celtic punk is punk rock fused with influences from Celtic music. Often, the bands add Celtic instruments such as bagpipes, fiddle, tin whistle, accordion, mandolin or banjo. Celtic punk bands often play covers of traditional Irish or Scottish folk songs, as well as original compositions. Examples of Celtic punk bands include the Pogues, Flogging Molly, the Real McKenzies and, Dropkick Murphys.

Scottish Gaelic punk 

Scottish Gaelic punk is a subgenre of punk rock in which bands sing some or all of their music in Scottish Gaelic. The Gaelic punk scene is, in part, an affirmation of the value of minority languages and cultures. Gaelic punk bands express political views, particularly those related to anarchism and environmentalism.

Chicano punk 

Chicano punk is music by punk bands of Mexican American ethnicity. The subgenre originated in Chicago's Pilsen and Little Village neighborhoods during the mid-1990s and later spread to the Los Angeles punk scene. Examples of Chicano punk bands include Los Crudos, Los Illegals and Cruzados.

Spanish raw punk 
Spanish raw punk is punk fused with the combination of Spanish punk and d-beat. The genre is also very rare and underground due to the level of demonstration. Often, bands add some type of crude lyrics in which they protest against police brutality, religion and government. Examples of Spanish raw punk bands include LAKRA among others whom are influenced by bands that include RIP, Animales Muertos, Los Crudos, @Patia No, Eskorbuto and Sin Dios.

Melodic punk 
Melodic punk is a type of punk that is melodic and up-beat.

Dark cabaret 

Dark cabaret may be a simple description of the theme and mood of a cabaret performance, but more recently has come to define a particular musical genre which draws on the aesthetics of the decadent, risqué German Weimar-era cabarets, burlesque and vaudeville shows with the stylings of post-1970s goth and punk music.

Latin punk 

Latin Punk is a subgenre of punk rock influenced by Latin American Rock en Español, Latino punk, Ska, and regional musical genres such as Bossa Nova, Samba, Cumbia and Boleros, among others. Although originally a subgenre born in the Latin Americas and Spain, the Latin Punk subgenre has grown internationally, providing Latin rock musicians abroad a connection to their roots. Examples of Latin Punk bands include Caracas, Los Furios, and Machetres.

Cowpunk 

Cowpunk or country punk combines punk rock with country music in sound, subject matter, attitude, and style. The term has also been applied to several bands that play a fast form of Southern rock. Examples of cow punk bands include the Gun Club, Jason & the Scorchers and Nine Pound Hammer.

Dance-punk 

Dance-punk (also known as disco punk, funk punk or indie-dance) mixes punk rock with disco, funk and electro music. Emerging in the late 1970s, it is influenced by the post-punk and No Wave movements and, more recently, the post-punk revival and art punk movements. Examples of dance-punk bands include: the Rapture, Liars and the Prodigy.

Folk punk 

Folk punk combines elements of folk music and punk rock. Its subgenres include Celtic punk and Gypsy punk. Most folk punk musicians perform their own compositions, in the style of punk rock, but using the acoustic guitar and bass, and often adding additional folk instruments, such as mandolins, accordions, banjos or violins. Examples of folk punk bands include Days N Daze, the Pogues, Andrew Jackson Jihad, and the earlier work of Against Me! and Violent Femmes.

Gypsy punk 

Gypsy punk mixes traditional Romani music, Klezmer or Eastern European music with punk rock. It typically features violin, acoustic guitar, accordion, and tenor saxophone, along with electric guitar, bass, and drums. Examples of Gypsy punk bands include Gogol Bordello, Motherhead Bug and Zydepunks.

Pop-punk 

Pop-punk (also known as punk-pop and other names) is a fusion genre that combines elements of punk rock with pop music and/or power pop, to varying degrees. It is not clear when the term pop-punk was first used, but pop-influenced punk rock had been around since the mid- to late-1970s. Examples of commercially successful pop-punk bands include Green Day, Blink-182, Sum 41, Fall Out Boy and Simple Plan.

Punk  blues 

Punk blues is a fusion of punk rock, blues rock and blues music. It also can be influenced by garage rock. the White Stripes, Flat Duo Jets, and Cage the Elephant are notable examples of punk blues bands.

Punk jazz 

Punk jazz describes the amalgamation of elements of the jazz tradition (usually free jazz and jazz fusion of the 1960s and 1970s) with the instrumentation or conceptual heritage of punk rock and hardcore punk. John Zorn, James Chance and the Contortions, Lounge Lizards, Universal Congress Of, Laughing Clowns and Zymosis are notable examples of punk jazz artists.

Punk metal 

Punk metal fuses elements of heavy metal music with punk rock. The fusion often involves extreme metal genres and hardcore punk. Bands described as punk metal include Motörhead, Corrosion of Conformity, Manic Street Preachers, English Dogs, Sum 41, Rage Against the Machine and L7.

"Punk metal" may also be used to refer to various genres rooted in both heavy metal and punk rock, most notably crossover thrash, a fusion of thrash metal with hardcore punk. Other genres containing or rooted in both punk and heavy metal that may be referred to as "punk metal" include crust punk, grindcore, grunge, metalcore, and sludge metal. Furthermore, the new wave of British heavy metal, speed metal, biker metal, and especially thrash metal were all heavily influenced by punk and hardcore punk.

Rapcore 

Rapcore fuses elements of punk rock, metal, hip hop, rap, and sometimes funk. Notable bands include Transplants, Zebrahead and Dog Eat Dog.

Ska punk and ska-core 

Ska punk is a fusion music genre that combines ska and punk rock, often playing down the former's R&B roots. Ska-core is a subgenre of ska punk, blending ska with hardcore punk. The more punk-influenced style often features faster tempos, guitar distortion, onbeat punk-style interludes (usually the chorus), and nasal, gruff, or shouted vocals. The more ska-influenced style features a more developed instrumentation and a cleaner vocal and musical sound. Examples of ska punk bands include Less Than Jake, Operation Ivy and Catch 22. Examples of ska-core bands include the Suicide Machines and the Mighty Mighty Bosstones and Voodoo Glow Skulls.

Synthpunk 

Synthpunk (also known as Electropunk) is a music genre combining elements of electronic music and punk rock. A number of bands use electronics and punk music together although the methods and resulting sounds can differ greatly. This has even led to the creation of more genres such as digital hardcore. Examples include Mindless Self Indulgence, The Prodigy, Atari Teenage Riot and Left Spine Down.

See also 
 Punk subculture
 Solarpunk
 List of hardcore punk subgenres

References 

Lists of music genres
Punk rock
Punk rock genres
Rock music lists